Igor Wandtke (born 3 November 1990) is a German judoka. He competed at the 2016 Summer Olympics in the men's 73 kg event, in which he was eliminated in the third round by Sagi Muki.

In 2021, he won one of the bronze medals in his event at the 2021 Judo World Masters held in Doha, Qatar.

References

External links

 
 
 
 

1990 births
Living people
German male judoka
Olympic judoka of Germany
Judoka at the 2016 Summer Olympics
Sportspeople from Lübeck
Judoka at the 2020 Summer Olympics
Medalists at the 2020 Summer Olympics
Olympic medalists in judo
Olympic bronze medalists for Germany
21st-century German people
20th-century German people